Area code 650 is a telephone area code in the North American Numbering Plan (NANP) for the San Francisco Bay Area in the U.S. state of California. It was split from area code 415 on August 2, 1997, and  includes most of San Mateo County (except the  northernmost portion), part of San Francisco, and the northwestern portion of Santa Clara County including Palo Alto, Mountain View, and Los Altos.

Prior to October 2021, area code 650 had telephone numbers assigned for the central office code 988. In 2020, 988 was designated nationwide as a dialing code for the National Suicide Prevention Lifeline, which created a conflict for exchanges that permit seven-digit dialing. This area code was therefore scheduled to transition to ten-digit dialing by October 24, 2021.

Service area

San Mateo County

Atherton
Belmont
Broadmoor
Burlingame
Colma
Daly City (small portion in 415)
East Palo Alto
El Granada
Emerald Lake Hills
Foster City
Half Moon Bay
Highlands-Baywood Park
Hillsborough
Kings Mountain
La Honda
Ladera
Loma Mar
Los Trancos Woods
Menlo Park
Middleton Tract
Millbrae
Montara
Moss Beach
North Fair Oaks
Pacifica
Pescadero
Portola Valley
Princeton-by-the-Sea
Redwood City
San Bruno
San Carlos
San Gregorio
San Mateo
Sky Londa
South San Francisco
West Menlo Park
Woodside

Santa Clara County

Los Altos
Los Altos Hills
Loyola
Mountain View
Palo Alto
Stanford
Sunnyvale (western edge)

San Francisco County
San Francisco

References

External links

 List of exchanges from AreaCodeDownload.com, 650 Area Code

650
650
Northern California
1997 introductions